The Ibis was a paddle-propelled steamship built in 1886 at Fairfield Shipbuilding and Engineering, Govan, Scotland for the British Government's Nile Expedition.

See also 

 More Ships Built at Govan

References 

Ships built on the River Clyde
Steamships of the United Kingdom
Ships built in Govan
1886 ships